Michel Jean-Pierre Barda (born 7 March 1965) is a Swedish and Israeli singer, actor, make up artist and hair dresser of French/Algerian Jewish descent. He is one of the founding members of the pop group Army of Lovers.

Biography 

Jean-Pierre Barda was born in Paris, France. His father was of Algerian Jewish origin. When he was seven, he moved to Sweden with his family, settling in Stockholm. Barda immigrated to Israel in 2015. He currently lives in Tel Aviv. He is openly gay since he came out at age 16. His parents kicked him out for his sexuality, and he did not have contact with them for 15 years after.

Music and acting career 
Barda started out working with Alexander Bard as a part of the music group Barbie. He initially called himself Farouk, but reverted to his real name when Barbie later evolved into the group Army of Lovers. Barda has been with the group throughout all of its incarnations.

In 2004, Barda considered joining a new band called Bodies Without Organs. This did not come to fruition, and Barda's explicit involvement extended only as far as co-writing BWO's first single "Living in a Fantasy".

Barda is also known as a hair-dresser and make-up artist. He has starred in movies, television and photo shoots.

Theater 
"Min Mamma Herr Albin" (Swedish version of La Cage Aux Folles) (1995) – the butler

Film 
 "Army of Lovers in the Holy Land" (2018) — himself
 "Livet är en schlager" (2000) – himself
 "Once in a Lifetime" (2000) (International: English title) – himself
 "House of Angels: The Second Summer" (1994) – himself

TV 
 "Rik Och Berömd" (Swedish version of Lifestyles of the Rich And Famous) – host
 "Miss Sweden 2002 Competition" – host
 "Sally" (1999) – himself
 "Silikon" (1999–2001) – make-over artist/host

See also
Music of Israel

References

External links 

 
 

1965 births
Swedish Jews
Gay Jews
Living people
Musicians from Stockholm
French emigrants to Sweden
Swedish emigrants to Israel
Swedish dance musicians
French dance musicians
Swedish male film actors
Swedish male television actors
French people of Algerian-Jewish descent
Swedish LGBT singers
French LGBT singers
Israeli LGBT singers
French gay actors
French gay musicians
Swedish gay actors
Swedish gay musicians
Israeli gay actors
Israeli gay musicians
English-language singers from Sweden
Gay singers
20th-century French LGBT people
21st-century French LGBT people
20th-century Swedish LGBT people
21st-century Swedish LGBT people
20th-century Israeli LGBT people
21st-century Israeli LGBT people
Melodifestivalen contestants of 2013